is a Japanese UCI Continental cycling team established in 2015. It gained UCI continental status in 2020.

Team roster

Major results

2022
 Stage 3 Tour de Kumano, Ryan Cavanagh

References

External links
 

UCI Continental Teams (Asia)
Cycling teams established in 2015
Cycling teams based in Japan